Phyllonorycter jabalshamsi is a moth   of the family Gracillariidae. It is found in the Al Hajar Mountain range in north-eastern Oman in dry, sunny, rocky and sandy disturbed areas at altitudes of about 1,000 meters.

The length of the forewings is 2.5–2.55 mm. All known specimens are worn, therefore there is no detailed description of the wing pattern. The hindwings are whitish with a golden shine. Adults are on wing in early January.

Etymology
The specific name refers to the highest mountain at the type locality situated in north-eastern Oman, Jabal Shams (meaning mountain of sun).

References

Moths described in 2012
jabalshamsi
Moths of the Arabian Peninsula

Taxa named by Jurate de Prins